Ireland competed at the 2007 World Aquatics Championships in Melbourne, Australia from 17 March to 1 April.

Swimming

Ireland entered 2 swimmers.

Women

References

Nations at the 2007 World Aquatics Championships
Ireland at the World Aquatics Championships
2007 in Irish sport